Ürümqi Diwopu International Airport   is an airport serving Ürümqi, the capital of the Xinjiang Uygur Autonomous Region in northwestern China. A hub for China Southern Airlines and as a focus city for Hainan Airlines, the airport handled 23,027,788 passengers in 2018, making it the 19th busiest airport in China by passenger traffic.

History
Ürümqi Airport was opened to foreign passengers in 1973, and has been used for emergency landings for flights between Europe and west Asia.

Facilities
The airport can allow the landing of large aircraft such as the Boeing 747. The  apron can accommodate over 30 aircraft.

Runways
 The first runway (07/25): in 1994 to accept the expansion, the flight zone level 4E, runway length 3600 meters, 45 meters wide, PCN value of 74, elevation 648 meters, with Class II precision approach.
 The second runway (???): under construction, located to the north of current runway, flight zone level 4F, runway length 3600 meters, 60 meters wide.
 The third runway (???): under construction, located to the north of current runway, flight zone level 4F, runway 3200 meters long, 60 meters wide.

Terminals

Terminal 1
The original terminal opened in 1974. It was closed between April 23, 2011, and August 30, 2013, for renovation. On April 1, 2014, operations were resumed. After the transformation of the T1 terminal has six security channels, 19 check-in counters, with the peak hourly 700 times the business capacity. This terminal is mainly for the regional aviation around Xinjiang province and low-cost aviation use, including Tianjin Airlines, Capital Aviation, Spring Airlines, Yunnan Xiangpeng Airlines, China United Airlines, Okay Airways and Western Airlines.

Terminal 2
Construction on this terminal started in April 1994, was completed in December 2001 through the national acceptance, and on May 12, 2002, the terminal opened. On July 10, 2010, it closed for a renovation project, and resumed operations on April 16, 2011. It serves most domestic routes outside of Xinjiang province, except for China Southern, Xiamen and Chongqing Airlines flights.

Terminal 3
Construction of Terminal 3 to the west of the older terminal building began in April 2007 at a cost of 2.8 billion yuan (350 million U.S. dollars). It increased Diwopu's ability to handle more than three times its current (2007) 5.13 million passengers annually to 16.35 million passengers. It can also handle 275,000 tons of cargo and 155,000 aircraft a year. Terminal 3 added 22 more jet bridges and nearly 106,000 square meters of new terminal space. The terminal opened in 2009.

Terminal 4
An expansion project, which began in 2017, is underway and will see a new terminal building covering almost 400,000 sq meters as well as two additional runways north of the existing one.

Airlines and destinations

Passenger

Cargo

Statistics

Other facilities
When the airline existed, China Xinjiang Airlines had its headquarters on the airport property.

Ground Transport
Line 1 of Ürümqi Metro opened on 25 October 2018 and links the airport to downtown Ürümqi.

See also

List of airports in China
China's busiest airports by passenger traffic

References

External links

Official website

China: Terror plot targeted Olympics MSNBC 9 March 2008

Airports in Xinjiang
Airport Diwopu
Buildings and structures in Ürümqi